Parliamentary elections were held in North Vietnam on 26 April 1964. Only candidates representing the Vietnamese Fatherland Front (an alliance of the Vietnamese Workers' Party together with various bloc parties and satellite organisations) contested the election.  Voter turnout was reported to be 98%.

Results

References

North Vietnam
Parliamentary election
One-party elections
Elections in North Vietnam
April 1964 events in Asia
Election and referendum articles with incomplete results